The La Crosse River is a  tributary of the Mississippi River in southwestern Wisconsin in the United States.

Course

The La Crosse River rises in northern Monroe County and flows generally west-southwestwardly into La Crosse County, through the Fort McCoy military installation and past Sparta, Rockland, Bangor and West Salem. It flows into the Mississippi River at the city of La Crosse.

In Monroe County, it collects the short Little La Crosse River, which flows for its entire course in Monroe County.

Downstream of Sparta, the river is paralleled by the La Crosse River State Trail.

See also
List of Wisconsin rivers

Sources

DeLorme (1992).  Wisconsin Atlas & Gazetteer.  Freeport, Maine: DeLorme.  .

External links
La Crosse River State Trail website

Rivers of Wisconsin
Tributaries of the Mississippi River
Rivers of La Crosse County, Wisconsin
Rivers of Monroe County, Wisconsin
Mississippi River watershed